The 1987 Hockey East Men's Ice Hockey Tournament was the 3rd Tournament in the history of the conference. It was played between March 10 and March 16, 1987. Quarterfinal games were played at home team campus sites, while the final four games were, for the first time, played at the Boston Garden in Boston, Massachusetts, the home venue of the NHL's Boston Bruins. By winning the tournament, Boston College received the Hockey East's automatic bid to the 1987 NCAA Division I Men's Ice Hockey Tournament.

Format
The tournament featured three rounds of play with each matchup being a single-elimination game. The team that finishes in seventh place is ineligible for tournament play. In the first round, the third seed and sixth seeds, and the fourth seed and fifth seeds played with the winner advancing to the semifinals. In the semifinals, the first seed and lowest remaining quarterfinalist and second seed and highest remaining quarterfinalist each play a game with the winners advancing to the championship game. The tournament champion receives an automatic bid to the 1987 NCAA Division I Men's Ice Hockey Tournament.

Conference standings
Note: GP = Games played; W = Wins; L = Losses; T = Ties; PTS = Points; GF = Goals For; GA = Goals Against

Bracket

Teams are reseeded after the quarterfinals

Note: * denotes overtime period(s)

Quarterfinals

(3) Maine vs. (6) Providence

(4) Boston University vs. (5) Northeastern

Semifinals

(1) Boston College vs. (5) Northeastern

(2) Lowell vs. (3) Maine

Championship

(1) Boston College vs. (3) Maine

Tournament awards

All-Tournament Team
F Ken Hodge (Boston College)
F Craig Janney (Boston College)
F Mike McHugh (Maine)
D Brian Leetch* (Boston College)
D Eric Weinrich (Maine)
G Al Loring (Maine)
LW James W. Gonzalez  (Boston College)
* Tournament MVP(s)

References

External links
Hockey East Online

Hockey East Men's Ice Hockey Tournament
HE tournament